Leytonstone Mosque, situated in Bushwood, Leytonstone, in the London borough of Waltham Forest, was opened in 1976 to cater to the local Muslim community. Since then, the mosque has grown in size and can accommodate about 1,000 (men only).  The organization, 'Muslims in Britain' classify the Leytonstone Mosque as, Deobandi (a movement within Sunni Islam).

Pre-Mosque Era
Prior to the Masjid's establishment, the Leytonstone Islamic Association was set up to serve the local Muslim population, and between 1969 and 1976 would do so by hiring out a hall, which would be used for prayers. Collections then took place in order to fund the purchase of a property which would later be converted into a mosque. In 1976, with donations entirely provided by the local Muslim community, a church was purchased, and subsequently converted into a mosque.

Services
The Mosque provides many services, which include evening classes for 5–16 year olds:
 Hifz (Memorization of the Quran)
 Arabic (Quran)
 Hadith
 Fiqh
 History
 Aqeedah

See also

Islam in London
Islamic schools and branches
Islamism in London
List of mosques in the United Kingdom

References

Mosques in London
1976 establishments in England
Islamic organizations established in 1976
Mosque
Mosques completed in 1976
Deobandi mosques